Jihad Naim (born 14 May 1947) is a Syrian sports shooter. He competed in the mixed skeet event at the 1980 Summer Olympics.

References

1947 births
Living people
Syrian male sport shooters
Olympic shooters of Syria
Shooters at the 1980 Summer Olympics
Place of birth missing (living people)